Maria Goodavage is a journalist and editor, and author of two New York Times best selling books about military dogs. Goodavage has been a staff writer for USA Today and the San Francisco Chronicle among other newspapers.

Authorship
On April 5, 2012, her book, Soldier Dogs: The Untold Story of America’s Canine Heroes was recorded at #15 on the Publishers Weekly Bestsellers list. On April 15, 2012, Soldier Dogs landed on The New York Times Best Seller list, coming in at No. 11 on the hardcover list. On March 27, 2012, she appeared on The Daily Show, with Jon Stewart.

Her second book about military dogs was published in October 2014. Top Dog: The Story of Marine Hero Lucca, was the cover story for Parade magazine on September 27, 2014, and the book was featured on the Today show just before the Macy's Thanksgiving Day Parade on November 27, 2014. Top Dog became Goodavage's second New York Times Best Seller in November when it ranked #4 on its monthly list for animal books.

Her book Secret Service Dogs: The Heroes Who Protect the President of the United States, is due to be published by Dutton/Penguin October 25, 2016. Goodavage gained unprecedented access to the United States Secret Service canine program during the research of the book.

Goodavage's father, Joseph F. Goodavage, was also a book author.

Published works 
 Top Dog: The Story of Marine Hero Lucca, Dutton Penguin, 2014. 
 Soldier Dogs: The Untold Story of America’s Canine Heroes, Dutton Penguin, 2012. 
 The Dog Lover's Companion to California: The Inside Scoop on Where to Take Your Dog, Avalon Travel Publishing 2011. 
 The Dog Lover's Companion to the San Francisco Bay Area: The Inside Scoop on Where to Take Your Dog, Avalon Travel Publishing, 2011.

References 

American bloggers
American editors
Living people
Northwestern University alumni
21st-century American women writers
Year of birth missing (living people)
American women bloggers
American women non-fiction writers
21st-century American non-fiction writers